Cornelis Dusart (April 24, 1660 – October 1, 1704) was a Dutch genre painter, draftsman, and printmaker.

He was born in Haarlem. Dusart was a pupil of Adriaen van Ostade from about 1675 to 1679, and was accepted into the Haarlem Guild of St. Luke in 1679. His works are similar in style and subject to those of his mentor. Especially notable are his highly finished drawings of  peasants, depicted singly in colored chalks and watercolor. He died in Haarlem.

Notes

References

Robinson, W. M., Bruegel to Rembrandt: Dutch and Flemish drawings from the Maida and George Abrams collection, Cambridge: Harvard University Art Museum, 2002. .

1660 births
1704 deaths
Dutch Golden Age painters
Dutch male painters
Dutch genre painters
Dutch Golden Age printmakers
Artists from Haarlem
Painters from Haarlem